Burden of Truth may refer to:

 Burden of Truth (album), a 2006 album by Circle II Circle
 Burden of Truth (TV series), a 2018 Canadian drama television series
 "Burden of Truth" (Chicago P.D.), a crossover episode of Chicago P.D.